The 1947 Oregon State Beavers football team was an American football team that represented Oregon State College in the Pacific Coast Conference (PCC) during the 1947 college football season.  Led by thirteenth-year head coach Lon Stiner, the team compiled a 5–5 record (3–4 in PCC, sixth), and outscored their opponents 171 to 136.  The Beavers played three home games on campus at Bell Field in Corvallis and one at Multnomah Stadium in Portland.

No Oregon State players were named to the All-Coast team.

Schedule

References

Oregon State
Oregon State Beavers football seasons
Oregon State Beavers football